David J. "Chip" Brightbill (born November 3, 1943) is a former member and Majority Leader of the Pennsylvania State Senate. He is a member of the Republican Party.

He was born in Lebanon, Pennsylvania to Jonathan and Verda (McGill) Brightbill and attended Pennsylvania Military College for two years before graduating from Pennsylvania State University in 1964. He went on to obtain a law degree at Duquesne University School of Law in 1970. Prior to being elected to the Senate in 1982, he served as Lebanon County District Attorney from 1977 to 1981. He was elected Majority Whip in 1989 and 1997 by the Republican caucus and became the Majority Leader in 2001 after Senator Joseph Loeper resigned in December 2000.

Brightbill served the 48th district, including all of Lebanon County, portions of Berks, Dauphin, and Lancaster Counties, and the Chester County borough of Elverson.

He was named runner up for the 2003 Politician of the Year by the political website PoliticsPA, who noted his growing influence in the 2003 budget negotiations.

Brightbill was defeated in the May 2006 Republican primary election by tire salesman Mike Folmer, receiving 36.8% of the vote. Brightbill's defeat was largely attributed to anger generated over a legislative pay raise vote in July 2005.

At the end of his term, Brightbill joined the Reading law firm of Stevens & Lee in their government affairs practice. Prior to joining Stevens & Lee, Brightbill was a partner of Siegrist, Koller, Brightbill & Long for 30 years.

On May 19, 2007, he received an honorary doctorate degree from Elizabethtown College.

See also
2005 Pennsylvania General Assembly pay raise controversy
Pennsylvania State Senate

References

External links

Pennsylvania Senate - David J. Brightbill official PA Senate website (archived)

Living people
People from Lebanon, Pennsylvania
Duquesne University alumni
Pennsylvania State University alumni
Republican Party Pennsylvania state senators
1942 births
Widener University alumni